The 46th International 500-Mile Sweepstakes was held at the Indianapolis Motor Speedway in Speedway, Indiana on Wednesday, May 30, 1962.

A historic pole day saw Parnelli Jones break the  barrier in qualifying. Rodger Ward and Len Sutton finished 1st-2nd for Leader Cards Racing.

The 1962 Indy 500 marked the final 500 wherein the entire 33-car field consisted of U.S.-born participants. It was also the first race held with the track surface paved entirely in asphalt, with just the ceremonial single yard of bricks exposed at the start/finish line.

Race schedule
For 1962, the Opening Day of practice was shifted back to Saturday April 28. Time trials were held on the second and third weekends of May, allowing the 500 Festival Open Invitation golf tournament the entire fourth weekend of May. Bump Day was held May 20, ten days prior to the race. Carburetion Day, the final day of practice was held Monday May 28, along with the 500 Festival Parade later that evening.

Time trials
Time trials were scheduled for four days.

Saturday May 12 – Pole Day time trials
Len Sutton was the first driver to make an assault on the track record. His fourth lap of 149.900 mph was a new one-lap track record.
Parnelli Jones became the first driver to break the 150 mph barrier. His first lap was run at 150.729 mph, a new all-time one-lap track record. All four of his laps were over 150 mph, and his four-lap average came in at 150.370 mph. Jones was rewarded by having 150 silver dollars poured into his helmet by Phil Hedback of Bryant Heating & Cooling.
Sunday May 13 – Second day time trials
The 13th proved to be an unlucky day for Norm Hall, whose previous crash in car #25 left him unscathed, but today, he spun the #41 Forbes Special on the Southwest Turn, hit the wall backwards and was severely injured, including a fractured left leg and possible skull fracture. Jim Rathmann and Troy Ruttman both were flagged off by their crews after they failed to get sufficient speed to qualify. Eddie Sachs could not reach an acceptable speed and a new engine was ordered for his Dean-Autolite Special machine. Dan Gurney left for Holland to compete in the Holland Grand Prix. Qualifiers this day were Eddie Johnson #32 at 146.592 and Bob Veith #96 at 146.157. 
Saturday May 19 – Third day time trials
Sunday May 20 – Fourth day time trials

Race recap

First half
Parnelli Jones took the lead at the start, and led the first 59 laps. The first incident on the track occurred on lap 17. A four-car crash in turn four involved Jack Turner, Bob Christie, Allen Crowe, and Chuck Rodee. A lengthy yellow light period was needed to clean up the incident.

Second half
Rodger Ward led the final 31 laps en route to victory. It was his second 500 win, after winning also in 1959. His Leader Cards teammate Len Sutton finished second, accomplishing the first team "sweep" of 1st-2nd since the Blue Crown team did it in 1947 and 1948.

After dominating much of the early race, Parnelli Jones, who started on the pole and led 120 laps, finished 7th. Jones chances for victory faded around the lap 125 mark when he lost his brakes. Unable to easily bring his car to a halt during pit stops, his crew put out tires so he could bump up against them or ride over them in order to help stop the car.

Box score

Alternates
First alternate: Dempsey Wilson (#31)
Second alternate: Ronnie Duman  (#28)

Failed to qualify

Chuck Arnold (#23, #37, #46, #47, #77)
Duane Carter (#72)
Bill Cheesbourg (#35, #59, #88)
Leon Clum  (#6, #23)
Jack Conely  (#89)
Russ Congdon 
Tommy Copp  (#58)
Johnny Coy  (#68, #92)
Chuck Daigh  (#35)
Jack Ensley  (#95)
Jack Fairman  (#32, #78)
Don Freeland (#36)
Roy Graham  (#55)
Norm Hall (#25, #41)
Jim Hemmings  (#65, #94)
Herb Hill  (#69) – Entry declined
Bruce Jacobi  (#22)
Ed Kostenuk  (#37)
Ralph Ligouri  (#68)
Bob Mathouser  (#43)
Mike McGreevey  (#46)
Al Miller  (#64)
Keith Rachwitz  (#33)
Gig Stephens  (#61)
Chuck Stevenson (#16)
Chuck Weyant

Race statistics

Broadcasting

Radio
The race was carried live on the IMS Radio Network. Sid Collins served as chief announcer. Fred Agabashian served as "driver expert." Newcomer Howdy Bell joined the crew, serving as a turn reporter. It was his first of over 40 years with the network. Turn reporter Mike Ahern, who debuted on the radio crew a year earlier, missed the 1962 race due to being in the Army. He would return in 1963.

Television

A few minutes of highlights were shown on ABC's "Wide World Of Sports".

Gallery

Notes

References

Works cited
Indianapolis 500 History: Race & All-Time Stats - Official Site
1962 Indianapolis 500 at RacingReference.info (Relief driver statistics)
1962 Indianapolis 500 Radio Broadcast, Indianapolis Motor Speedway Radio Network

Indianapolis 500 races
Indianapolis 500
Indianapolis 500
1962 in American motorsport
May 1962 sports events in the United States